Bulkeley or Bulkley is a surname. Notable persons with that surname include:

 Charles Bulkeley Bulkeley-Johnson (1867–1917), British Officer 
 Elisabeth Rivers-Bulkeley (1924–2006), Austrian stock broker
 Henry Bulkeley (c. 1641–1698), English courtier and politician
 James Michael Freke Bulkeley (1761–1796), Nova Scotian civil servant and political figure
 John D. Bulkeley (1911–1996), American Vice Admiral in United States Navy
 Lucius Duncan Bulkley (1845–1928), American dermatologist
 Mary Bulkley (1747/48–1792), British comedy and Shakespearean actress, and dancer
 Morgan Bulkeley (1837–1922), American politician, business and sports executive
 Peter Bulkley (1583–1659), English-born Puritan preacher and American colonist of Massachusetts
 Richard Bulkeley (died 1621) (fl.1563–1621), Welsh politician
 Richard Bulkeley (governor) (1717–1800), Irish-born colonial governor of Nova Scotia
 Robert Bulkeley, 2nd Viscount Bulkeley (died 1688), MP for  Anglesey 1660–61, Caernarvonshire 1675–79, and Anglesey 1685–89
 Robert Bulkeley (died 1702), son of 2nd Viscount, MP for Beaumaris 1701–02
 Robert J. Bulkley (1880–1965), American Congressman and Senator from Ohio
 Thomas Bulkeley, 1st Viscount Bulkeley (1585–1659), North Welsh landowner and Royalist supporter during the English Civil War
 Thomas Bulkeley, 7th Viscount Bulkeley (1752–1822), English aristocrat and politician

See also
 Bulkeley was one of the GWR 3031 Class locomotives that were built for and run on the Great Western Railway between 1891 and 1915; originally named North Star, renamed in 1906.
 Bulkley River, a tributary of the Skeena River in north central British Columbia, named for an engineer for the Russian–American Telegraph project and explorer of the region
 Bulkley Valley, formed by the above-mentioned river